The 2011 Indian Premier League Final was a day/night Twenty20 cricket match played between the Chennai Super Kings and the Royal Challengers Bangalore on 28 May 2011 at the M. A. Chidambaram Stadium, Chennai to determine the winner of the 2011 Indian Premier League, an annual professional Twenty20 cricket league in India. It ended as the defending champion Super Kings defeated the Royal Challengers by 58 runs.

The Royal Challengers, captained by Daniel Vettori, topped the group stage table with 19 points in 14 matches, whereas the Super Kings, led by MS Dhoni, stood at the second position with just one point less than the Royal Challengers.

Royal Challengers qualified for the final for the second time in their Indian Premier League History. They previously qualified for the final at 2009 Indian Premier League where they lost to the Deccan Chargers by six runs. On the other hand, it was the third overall and second consecutive final for the Super Kings. They previously qualified for the final at 2008 Indian Premier League where they lost to Rajasthan Royals by three wickets in a last ball thriller. and at the very previous, 2010 Indian Premier League where they got a 22 runs win over the Mumbai Indians to bag their first ever Indian Premier League title.

It was also the first time that a defending champion of the tournament qualify for the final and defend their title. Previous champions Rajasthan Royals (2008) and Deccan Chargers (2009) failed to qualify for the final or defend their title at the next tournament. With this win the Chennai Super Kings also became the only team to have won the IPL on more than one occasion.

Match

Summary 
Winning the toss, Super Kings' captain MS Dhoni elected to bat first. The Super Kings scored 205 runs in 20 overs with a loss of 5 wickets. They scored 159 in their opening partnership before Mike Hussey got out after scoring 63 runs from 45 balls. But the other opener Murali Vijay was the top scorer for his side. He scored 95 runs just missing out a century. Chris Gayle was the best bowler for the Royal Challengers. He took two wickets. In reply, Royal Challengers failed to build a good pressure opening partnership when their opener Chris Gayle got out for a duck in the third ball of their innings. The Royal Challengers couldn't play effectively in the game as they couldn't build partnerships. Their innings came to an end at 147 with loss of eight wickets. Saurabh Tiwary scored unbeaten 42 for the Royal Challengers. Super Kings bowler Ravichandran Ashwin took three wickets for 16 runs. Murali Vijay was awarded the man of the match for his knock of 95.

Despite being at the losing end Royal Challengers' Chris Gayle was named the man of the tournament for scoring 608 runs with bat and taking 8 wickets with ball. He also won the Orange Cap for scoring 608 runs. Lasith Malinga from Mumbai Indians won the Purple Cap for taking 28 wickets. The Fly Kingfisher Fair Play Award was again won by the Chennai Super Kings for topping the fair-play table.  Iqbal Abdullah of Kolkata Knight Riders was awarded the Emerging Player of the Year award.

Scorecard 
On-field umpires:  Asad Rauf and  Simon Taufel

Third umpire:  Kumar Dharmasena

Match referee:  Roshan Mahanama

Reserve umpire:  Krishnaraj Srinath

Toss: Super Kings elected to bat first

Result: Super Kings won by 58 runs

League impact: Super Kings won the 2011 Indian Premier League

Source: 

Fall of wickets:  1-159 (Hussey, 14.5 overs), 2-188 (M Vijay, 18.1 overs), 3-188 (Dhoni, 18.2 overs), 4-199 (A Morkel, 19.4 overs), 5-199 (Raina, 19.5 overs)

Fall of wickets:  1-0 (Gayle, 0.3 overs), 2-16 (Agarwal, 2.3 overs), 3-48 (de Villiers, 6.3 overs), 4-62 (Pomersbach, 8.3 overs), 5-69 (Kohli, 9.6 overs), 6-70 (Vettori, 10.2 overs), 7-92 (A Mithun, 12.6 overs), 8-130 (Z Khan, 18.4 overs)

References

External links 
Official website of Indian Premier League

Premier League Final
Final
2011 Indian Premier League